The 1993 Australian Men's Hardcourt Championships was an ATP men's tennis tournament held at Memorial Drive in Adelaide, Australia from 4 January until 10 January 1993. It was played on outdoor hard courts and was part of the World Series of the 1993 ATP Tour. It was the 49th edition of the tournament. Unseeded Nicklas Kulti won the singles title.

Finals

Singles

 Nicklas Kulti defeated  Christian Bergström 3–6, 7–5, 6–4
 It was Kulti's 1st singles title of the year and the 2nd of his career.

Doubles

 Todd Woodbridge /  Mark Woodforde defeated  John Fitzgerald /  Laurie Warder 6–4, 7–5

References

External links
 ITF tournament edition details